Henrique de Sampaio e Castro Pereira da Cunha da Silveira (26 January 1901 – 9 April 1973) was a Portuguese épée fencer. He competed at the 1920, 1924, 1928 and 1936 Olympics and won a team bronze medal in 1928. His teams finished fourth in 1920 and 1924, and his best individual result was sixth place in 1936.

References

External links
 

1901 births
1973 deaths
People from Terceira Island
Portuguese male épée fencers
Olympic fencers of Portugal
Fencers at the 1920 Summer Olympics
Fencers at the 1924 Summer Olympics
Fencers at the 1928 Summer Olympics
Fencers at the 1936 Summer Olympics
Olympic bronze medalists for Portugal
Olympic medalists in fencing
Medalists at the 1928 Summer Olympics
20th-century Portuguese people